Alkaline hydrolysis (also called biocremation, resomation, flameless cremation, aquamation or water cremation) is a process for the disposal of human and pet remains using lye and heat, and is an alternative to burial or cremation.

Process
Instead, the body is effectively broken down into its chemical components, which takes approximately four to six hours. A lower temperature and pressure may be used, but at a longer duration (14 to 16 hours). At the beginning of the process, the mixture is very basic, with a pH level of approximately 14; pH drops to 11 by the end, but the final pH level depends on the total operation time and the amount of fat in the body.

The result is a quantity of green-brown tinted liquid (containing amino acids, peptides, sugars and salts) and soft, porous white bone remains (calcium phosphate) easily crushed in the hand (although a cremulator is more commonly used) to form a white-colored dust. The "ash" can then be returned to the next of kin of the deceased. The liquid is disposed of either through the sanitary sewer system, or through some other method, including use in a garden or green space.

This alkaline hydrolysis process has been championed by a number of ecological campaigning groups, for using 90 kWh of electricity, one-quarter the energy of flame-based cremation, and producing less carbon dioxide and pollutants. It is being presented as an alternative option at some British crematorium sites. , about 1,000 people had chosen this method for the disposition of their remains in the United States.

Alkaline hydrolysis has also been adopted by the pet and animal industry. A handful of companies in North America offer the procedure as an alternative to pet cremation. Alkaline hydrolysis is also used in the agricultural industry to sterilize animal carcasses that may pose a health hazard, because the process inactivates viruses, bacteria, and prions causing transmissible spongiform encephalopathy.

History
The process was originally developed as a method to process animal carcasses into plant food, patented by Amos Herbert Hobson in 1888. In 2005, Bio-Response Solutions designed, sold, and installed the first single cadaver alkaline hydrolysis system at the Mayo Clinic where it was still in use as of 2019. In 2007, a Scottish biochemist, Sandy Sullivan, started a company making the machines, and calling the process (and company) Resomation.

Religious views

In Christian countries and cultures, cremation has historically been discouraged and viewed as a desecration of God's image, and as interference with the resurrection of the dead taught in scripture. It is now acceptable to some denominations.

The Eastern Orthodox Church does not allow cremation.

The Roman Catholic Church allows cremation of bodies as long as it is not done in denial of the beliefs in the sacredness of the human body or the resurrection of the dead.

In 2008, Renée Mirkes published the first Catholic moral analysis of alkaline hydrolysis. He argued that it is morally neutral and may be an alternative to burial on similar grounds to cremation.

However, the Catholic Church in the United States does not approve of alkaline hydrolysis as a method of final disposal of human remains. In 2011, Donald Cardinal Wuerl, Archbishop of Washington and then chairman of the Committee on Doctrine of the United States Conference of Catholic Bishops (USCCB), determined it "unnecessarily disrespectful of the human body." When alkaline hydrolysis was proposed in New York state in 2012, the New York State Catholic Conference condemned the practice, stating that hydrolysis does not show sufficient respect for the teaching of the intrinsic dignity of the human body.

Desmond Tutu, former Anglican Archbishop of Cape Town, was aquamated, per his wish.

Judaism forbids cremation as it is not in line with the teachings of respect and dignity due to humans, who are created in God's image. Islam also forbids cremation of the deceased. Both religions are likely to reject alkaline hydrolysis as they believe that the body must be laid to rest through burial in order to prepare for the afterlife.

Sikhism, Hinduism, and Buddhism each place theological emphasis on the burning of the corpse which may prevent alkaline hydrolysis from replacing cremation.

Legal status

Australia 
Aquamation based in New South Wales is the only company to provide alkaline hydrolysis in Australia, with the remains being used as fertilizer on plantation forests, due to difficulty with obtaining permits from Sydney Water.

Belgium

Flanders 
The Flemish minister of Interior Administration Bart Somers asked in September 2021 the opinion of an advisory bioethics committee on resomation. The advice, received in November 2021, saw no objections.

Canada
Saskatchewan approved the process in 2012, becoming the first province to do so. Quebec and Ontario have also legalized the process.
A funeral home in Granby, Quebec, was the first in the province to receive an alkaline hydrolysis machine.

Ireland 
From January 2023, Water Cremation became available. It was first country in the EU to offer this form of burial.

Handling of the water: when the process is complete the remaining water undergoes further treatment to ensure that it is completely sterile. Analysis is then completed to ensure Water Authority standards are met. At this stage the water can be recycled back to the Local Authority water treatment plant.

Mexico 
Since 2019, Grupo Gayosso offers alkaline hydrolysis in Baja California.

The Netherlands 

In May 2020, the Health Council of the Netherlands issued an advisory report on the admissibility of new techniques of disposing of the dead. The Council proposed a framework to assess alkaline hydrolysis. It concluded that alkaline hydrolysis is safe, dignified and sustainable. In addition to alkaline hydrolysis, the council also considered human composting as a technique to dispose bodies yet concluded that too little is known about composting and hence it cannot be assessed whether this technique fulfills the conditions. Taking into account the council's recommendations, the Ministry of the Interior and Kingdom Relations prepared a law proposal to amend the Corpse Disposal Act. Once the proposed law has been submitted to the Parliament, the democratic process to admit alkaline hydrolysis as body disposal technique can be commenced.

South Africa
In November 2019, Avbob introduced aquamation in South Africa, following the mutual assurance society's recent introduction of the alkaline hydrolysis process at its Maitland agency in Cape Town. Aquamation has been legal in South Africa since then. Following his death in December 2021 the body of Archbishop Desmond Tutu was aquamated.

United Kingdom
A public crematorium operated by Sandwell Metropolitan Borough Council at Rowley Regis, central England, was the first to receive planning permission to offer the process but in March 2017, the local water utility, Severn Trent Water, refused the council's application for a "trade effluent permit" because there was no water industry standard regulating the disposal of liquefied human remains into sewers.

United States
Alkaline hydrolysis as a method of final disposition of human remains is legal in 21 states . Legislation is pending in New Jersey, New York, North Carolina, Ohio, Pennsylvania, and Virginia. The process was legal in New Hampshire for several years but amid opposition by religious lobby groups it was banned in 2008 and a proposal to legalize it was rejected in 2013.
Alkaline hydrolysis has been used for cadavers donated for research at the University of Florida since the mid-1990s and at the Mayo Clinic since 2005. UCLA uses the process to dispose of donor bodies.

See also
 Burial
 Promession

References

Further reading
 New in mortuary science: Dissolving bodies with lye – ABC News
 New body 'liquefaction' unit unveiled in Florida funeral home – BBC News

Death customs